The Mississippi National River and Recreation Area is a  and  protected corridor along the Mississippi River through the Minneapolis–Saint Paul metro in the U.S. state of Minnesota, from the cities of Dayton and Ramsey, to just downstream of Hastings. This stretch of the upper Mississippi River includes natural, historical, recreational, cultural, scenic, scientific, and economic resources of national significance. This area is the only national park site dedicated exclusively to the Mississippi River. The Mississippi National River and Recreation Area is sometimes abbreviated as MNRRA (often pronounced like "minn-ruh") or MISS, the four letter code assigned to the area by the National Park Service. The Mississippi National River and Recreation Area is classified as one of four national rivers in the United States, and despite its name it is technically not one of the 40 national recreation areas.

History 
The Mississippi National River and Recreation Area was established in 1988 as a new unique type of national park known as a partnership park. Unlike traditional national parks, the National Park Service is not a major land owner and therefore does not have control over land use. The National Park Service works in partnership with several partners (e.g., local, state, and federal governments, non-profits, businesses, educational institutions, and individual people) who own land along the river or who have an interest in the Mississippi River to achieve the National Park Service's mission to protect and preserve for future generations. Some of the most prominent attractions within the park include the St. Anthony Falls Historic District (including Mill City Museum, the Guthrie Theater, the Stone Arch Bridge, and Mill Ruins Park), the Historic Fort Snelling and the adjacent Fort Snelling State Park, Minnehaha Falls, and the rustic Winchell Trail. There are many additional attractions, trails, and programs all within the Minneapolis–St. Paul metropolitan area. It is located in parts of Anoka, Dakota, Hennepin, Ramsey, and Washington counties, all within the Minneapolis–Saint Paul metropolitan area.

As of 2016, the area has two visitor centers, one located inside the Science Museum of Minnesota in St. Paul and the other at Upper St. Anthony Falls Lock and Dam in Minneapolis, both of which are staffed by National Park Service rangers. The Minneapolis visitor center offers three free tours daily of the Upper Saint Anthony Lock and surrounding area. Each year, the rangers manage community activities, including interpretive sessions, bike rides, and movies, that help to educate the local community about the natural and human history of the area.

Sections
The Mississippi National River and Recreation Area is between River Miles 879 and 806. The National Park Service categorizes it into five approximate sections:

 The Wild and Scenic River (River Mile 879 to 863) — North of the Twin Cities the river is a state wild and scenic river, slowing as it reaches the Coon Rapids Dam. This segment begins at the confluence of Crow River and the Mississippi near Ramsey and Dayton and flows to Banfil Island at Brooklyn Park and Fridley. 
The River of the Falls/The Urban River (River Mile 862 to 852) — From Brooklyn Center the river approaches several falls, beginning with Saint Anthony, and enters the historic Milling District near downtown Minneapolis.
 The Gorge/Where the Rivers Meet (River Mile 852 to 843)  — After the Milling District, the river enters the Mississippi gorge that extends past Fort Snelling State Park to its confluence with the Minnesota River.
 The Working River (River Mile 840 to 833)  — From near downtown Saint Paul, the river begins to feature tow boats and barge traffic as it winds to the Pig's Eye Lake Scientific and Natural Area.
 The Forested Floodplain (River Mile 833 to 806)  — From South Saint Paul, the river widens further with numerous backwaters and the bluffs are higher. Past Hastings and toward the Vermillion River, the Mississippi becomes wilder again.

Places to visit
The park's website lists the following locations or features as partner sites.

See also
 Geography of Minnesota
List of areas in the United States National Park System
Saint Croix National Scenic Riverway

References

External links

 Mississippi National River and Recreation Area
 Mississippi Park Connection

 
Mississippi Gorge
1988 establishments in Minnesota
Protected areas established in 1988
Protected areas of Anoka County, Minnesota
Protected areas of Dakota County, Minnesota
Protected areas of Hennepin County, Minnesota
Protected areas of Ramsey County, Minnesota
Protected areas of Washington County, Minnesota